Ibn Thabit is an anonymous hip hop musician from Libya known for his anti-government songs. Thabit has been living in Libya where any form of dissent was banned by law in Muammar Gaddafi's regime and could have resulted in his being arrested and imprisoned, the primary reason for his using an epithet to preserve his anonymity. Ibn Thabit's music is considered to have given a voice to Libyans who wish to express themselves politically and non-violently despite being disenfranchised. Dissenting cultural figures have been arrested and tortured in a number of countries during the Arab Spring.

Ibn Thabit considers himself to be an ordinary Libyan who is "speaking the thoughts of many Libyan youth". He claims that he is inspired by the people, telling a journalist from the Danish newspaper Information that he was more affected by conversations with fellow Libyans than by anything else. Not much is known about him other than that he is young, male and Libyan. He is thought to be from Tarhunah. Ibn Thabit was one of the early critics of Gaddafi in 2011, the nascent movement building up to a full-fledged civil war, part of the Arab Spring.

Popular music of kind produced by Ibn Thabit represents the cultural face of the 2011 Libyan civil war. One of his works praises the city of Benghazi.

Ibn Thabit has his own website with support from people abroad on which many of his own songs and others produced in collaboration are freely available for download. On his website, Ibn Thabit claims that to have been "attacking Gaddafi" with music since 2008, when he posted his first song, "Moammar - the coward", on the internet.

Lyrics of a song "Al-Soo'al" released by Ibn Thabit on YouTube on 27 January 2011, weeks before the riots began in Libya are indicative of the rebel sentiment. Ibn Thabit's music is featured in a compilation of Arabic Spring resistance rap songs by Khala labelled Khala's Mixtape Volume 1.

Ibn Thabit has also podcast about reconciliation, an important though controversial subject on the Free Libya Podcast. Ibn Thabit uses the internet and social media such as Facebook, YouTube, Twitter, webcasting, podcasting and other means to spread his music and message. He regularly tweets about his music, news and broadcasts messages to the general populace. Ibn Thabit is the first Libyan blogger to blog in Amazigh, a language spoken by the Berber peoples of North Africa.

Discography
Contributing artist
The Rough Guide To Arabic Revolution (World Music Network, 2013)

References

External links
Ibn Thabit's former website

Living people
Libyan rappers
21st-century Libyan male singers
People of the First Libyan Civil War
Year of birth missing (living people)
Unidentified musicians